The 2022 Prix de l'Arc de Triomphe was a horse race held at Longchamp Racecourse on Sunday 2 October 2022. It was the 101st running of the Prix de l'Arc de Triomphe. The race was won by  Kirsten Rausing's five-year-old mare Alpinista, trained in Britain by Sir Mark Prescott and ridden by Luke Morris. It was a first win in the race for the owner, trainer and jockey. Alpinista became the second five-year-old mare to win the Arc after Corrida in 1937.

Race details
 Sponsor: Qatar Racing and Equestrian Club
 Purse:€
 Going: Very Soft
 Distance: 2,400 metres
 Number of runners: 20
 Winner's time: 2:35.71
	N°	HORSE / JOCKEYS
1.	14	ALPINISTA / Luke Morris
2.	15	VADENI / Christophe Soumillon
3.	2	TORQUATOR TASSO / Lanfranco Dettori
4.	 16	AL HAKEEM / Cristian Demuro
5.	 13	GRAND GLORY / Maxime Guyon
6.	 18	WESTOVER / Rob Hornby
7.	 20	LUXEMBOURG / Ryan-Lee More
8.	 7	BROOME / Wayne-Martin Lordan
9.	 5	ALENQUER / Tom Marquand
10.	 17	ONESTO / Stéphane Pasquier
11.	 11	TITLEHOLDER / Kazuo Yokoyama
12.	 10	MENOCINO / René Piechulek
13.	 1	MISHRIFF / William Buick
14.	 8	STAY FOOLISH / Christophe-Patrice Lemaire
15.	 3	MARE AUSTRALIS / Bauyrzhan Murzabayev
16.	 4	SEALIWAY / Mickael Barzalona
17.	 12	BUBBLE GIFT / Olivier Peslier
18.	 6	DEEP BOND / Yuga Kawada
19.	 19	DO DEUCE / Yutaka Take
20.	 9	MOSTAHDAF / James Crowley

References

Prix de l'Arc de Triomphe
 2022
Prix de l'Arc de Triomphe
2022 in Paris
Prix de l'Arc de Triomphe